Peggy Ann Freeman (August 31, 1945 – May 17, 1979), known professionally as Donyale Luna, was an American supermodel and actress who gained popularity in Western Europe during the late 1960s. Generally cited as "the first Black supermodel", Luna was the first African-American model to appear on the cover of the British edition of Vogue, in March 1966. 

Although the first Black cover model, Luna was not the first black model as she was preceded by models (then called mannequins) like Aïcha Goblet (Artists model), Adrienne Fidelin (first black model in Harpers Bazaar in September 1937), Sarah Harris, Bani Yelverton (first black model to appear in an American fashion show) and Anthea August (first black model in British vogue in 1963) who entered into previously 'White' modelling spaces before the 1966 cover. Luna  entered modeling in a period that favored "white passing models" and has been described as "the first Black model who really began to change things; to enable more diverse beauty paradigms to break through". She is known to have been a covergirl 11 times between 1965 and 1975.

She appeared in several underground films like the screen tests of Andy Warhol (1966), and had roles in Qui êtes-vous, Polly Maggoo? (1966), and most notably as Enotea in the 1969 Federico Fellini film Fellini Satyricon, as well as Otto Preminger's Skidoo (1968) in the role of "'God's Mistress".

Early life
Donyale Luna as she later became known, was born Peggy Ann Freeman in Detroit, Michigan, to working-class parents Nathaniel Freeman and Peggy Freeman (née Hertzog) in 1945. She was one of three daughters, Lillian, Peggy-Ann, and Josephine. Her parents had moved to Detroit from Georgia as part of the Great Migration. Her father worked in production at the Ford plant, of African-American heritage, and her mother as a secretary for the Young Women's Christian Association, of both African-American and European heritage, been given the nickname 'Big Peggy' to differentiate her from Peggy-Ann, who was "Little Peggy". Luna's parents married and divorced on four separate occasions due to their "headstrong characters" and Nathaniel's relatives alcoholism. They lived a "financially stable upbringing in a middle-class neighbourhood of Detroit" on Scotten Avenue. As a child, she would frequently go on trips to local cinemas with her father and in summer to swim at the "Kronk Gym" in Detroit.

As a child, she attended the Detroit High School of Commerce, where she studied data processing and typing. As a teen, she attended Cass Technical High School, where she studied journalism, performing arts and languages and was in the school choir, local community theatre and the experimental Concept East Theater. too increase her pragmatical social prestige or standing.

Exemplified in an advert for a polyester peasant blouse in 1966 for Ebony magazine, the iconography work was said to evoke the black and white images of Man Ray, acknowledging the shift of the early 20th century "visual modernism" morphed into the "disjuncted body" (see Mikhail Bakhtin's theory of the grotesque and read Negro: An Anthology (1934) by Nancy Cunard, Hugh D. Ford, p. 417), a moving away from the classical Western notion of what a body should be, to one of "distorted corporeal forms" originating in African Arts, Expressionism and Cubism and the body language of Josephine Baker which Luna emulates in the advertisement to create a more "dynamic" image of herself and African-American visual imagery. 
As a content creator, "Luna's referencing of [Baker and Nefertiti] within the European context signaled her identification with them", as Black women "heroines and tropes" which Luna used as a model to emulate what Black success could be presented as in an environment which responded to both figures to by "primitivizing, sexualizing and ultimately dehumanizing [them in] ... exotic or erotic roles that did not provide occupational transitions to more fulfilling, post spectacle lives".

Brown notes of how (in the early 20th century) "the expression of primitive glamour by self-consciously urban sophisticates such as Baker ... could equally be produced as a reimagining of subject-object relations, a paradoxical critique and deployment of pleasures[,] ...  despite the motion, vitality, energy and erotic fission imagined to be at the heart of the primitive. ... [Primitive glamour allowed for self-assertion so that the primitive role] offered something more than crippled self-expression: primitive glamour [relied] ... on the use of personae, impersonation, or a kind of eclipse of the human subject, ... [which although perilous] also offered substantial creative results ... [so] rather than silencing artists with the gag of stereotype or the limitations of the market, [Primitive glamour] often enabled the merging of the subject and object" questioning perceptions of who and what it was to be 'primitive', creating the formation of early Black glamour aesthetics in 1920's Europe, much as in Primitivism aesthetics. For instance in her "primitive" shoot with Harper's Bazaar dressed in animal print in 1965, Luna "construct[s] and perform[s] an oppositional Black glamour" by using the provided clothes or "[tangible] things ... [to] interpellate [her audience] in specific ways, combining narrative with history and materiality to structure specific gestures and movements ... [in] working with her own effective engagement with the material as "dances with things", undoing the work of glamour as a white racial project", thus creating an aspirational lifestyle for potential Black audiences. And with "her gesticular poses in print magazines emphasized her angular frame, while her assertive body language—including a powerful stare called "the Look" by fashion magazines and later described as "ocular assault" ... became her signature [pose]" used to entrance her audience, Freeman used "Donyale" to create an altogether new image or aesthetic of what constituted Black glamour, a new beauty paradigm for African-American visual imagery and Black subject agency; developed from Baker's era of primitive glamour; into previously white spaces.

She was believed to have met the artist Mati Klarwein (who made psychedelic album covers for artists like Jimi Hendrix) through Sam Rivers, at an "occupational gathering" for Miles Davis in New York in 1964 where her likeness appears in his painting Time, of a circle of gold leaf surrounded by scimitars representing the earth and sky. In the circle sits a 'polymorphous figure ... an aggregate of fire, water, multiple faces of beautiful women, female breasts, male genitalia, rainbow patterns, animal heads, skulls derived from Tibetan and Hindu religious imagery ... topped off by Donyale Luna's trimorphic head', also being portrayed in 1967 as in a self-portrait. "Klarwein dedicated Milk n' Honey (1973), his book of reproduced paintings".

In Europe she was also a part of the 'rock music scene', having been featured in the Italian music video for Patty Pravo's song Michelle (1969).

In her 1975 Playboy interview, she held the belief that beauty was 'something not physical but something beyond that', she also noted that children were more readily accepting of her form of 'beauty'. 
She reported to the Argentinian Press in 1969: "Beauty is something else, something inexplicable that each person carries inside. This form of beauty related to Her visions. There's a great division coming about on this planet. There are going to be a lot of people who will die because they just don't know how to live. They don't know what life's about, they don't know how to give, how to love - nor do they want to. And those who are beautiful enough - I don't mean physically but something beyond that - they will have the chance to learn how to fly, to be beautiful, to rise above the level of the normal human - to be superior beings first and eventually gods and goddesses."

She anticipated a (spiritual) "armageddon" she called "The Great Division" due to her perception that other peoples lack of understanding between themselves would lead to this great divide (based on superficial issues like physical beauty) in the future which she foresaw.

Personal life

Racial Identity
Throughout her life and career, Luna claimed to be of various, mixed ethnic backgrounds, often playing down her African American ancestry since being a teenager in Detroit. Later on in her life she insisted that her biological father was a man with the surname Luna and that her mother was Indigenous Mexican and of Afro-Egyptian lineage. According to Luna, one of her grandmothers was reportedly a former Irish actress who married a black interior decorator, however, the historical accuracy of this is questionable. She would also claim to be of 'Polynesian' descent in high school as the common practice at the time was for immigrants and minority groups to 'give themselves makeovers to better assimilate into modern [American] society.' She often made up tall tales to make her seem more grandiose, part of the character of Donyale Luna she began in her teenage years, including beguiling stories designed to shock or amuse such as losing her parents in a car accident and being adopted, or replying to the question of her heritage with the line "I'm from the moon darling" which some have construed to mean she denied her heritage as a Black woman. With 'her penchant for wearing blue contact lenses, was seen by some as race betrayal ... [it] was probably part of a process of reinvention that had begun in her teenage years. In fact constructing a new identity [as Donyale Luna]'.

Dream Cazzaniga on her mother leaving Detroit for New York writes of the likelihood of employment as a model how 'there were virtually no modeling opportunities for non-white faces anywhere other than dedicated African-American publications such as Ebony. ... [Finding it amazing how Luna] was to leave home for Manhattan at that point in history, with no clear plans or steady income - just a telephone number hastily written down by a stranger.' The only other industries which used models of color included the soft drinks industry such as Coco-Cola in 1957 or the Tobacco industry. Due to the prejudices of a white dominated industry where white was the default and Black the other, with racist language, dress, and behavior used toward her in work and everyday life in New York, she moved from North America to Europe "where she likely found an audience more accepting of her skin color", describing herself as "multi-ethnic". Europe at the time was seen as more accepting of white-passing Black models such as, Ophelia Devore, who had modeled herself and had her own agency's models working in Paris such as Dorothea Church in the 1950s and unmistakably African-American models like , who was the first Black model to walk on the European catwalk. Darker models such as Helen Williams later became more accepted by the 1960s. In the Sunday Times Magazine in 1966, Harold Carlton hailed her as "the completely New Image of the Negro woman. Fashion finds itself in an instrumental position for changing history, however slightly, for it is about to bring out into the open the veneration, the adoration, the idolization of the Negro".

As for the United States, "until the advent of the American Civil Rights Movement in the 1950s and 1960s the fashion industry operated its own kind of apartheid, which entirely excluded non-white models from its magazines, advertising and catwalk shows." Luna could work alongside models like Jean Shrimpton and Veruschka and command the same salary, but was thought of as exotic, becoming a victim of Othering (also see Dominance hierarchy) first by white then later the Black community; compounded as both the "girl-next-door" and "exotic" negro model type. With the advent of the civil rights movement in the United States 'so too did society's fascination with the "exotic" and "alien". ... Almost against her own will, she became a symbol. Some people declared her a Masai warrior, Gauguinesque, Nefertiti reborn. Others claimed she was another species entirely - or from outer space!'. Time in 1966 called her a 'creature of contrasts. One minute sophisticated, the next fawnlike, now exotic and faraway'. Racialist language such as being 'from outer space' was routinely used and was adopted by Luna in her Donyale character in a bid to overcome the boundaries this language created towards her as a Black body in the American public eye, and evolved other time to accommodate this prejudiced language. She said in late 1966 to a reporter that "Fashion photographers saw me as something different but I'm certain it has nothing to do with my color. I never think of myself as a brown girl".

Due to the color barrier, by then "the prestige of her modeling jobs had now shifted, from photo editorial work for Harper's Bazaar to the secondary ... advertising market [in Ebony magazine]".  The so-called secondary market, however, was worth an estimated $15 billion and white advertisers who began working in the market preferred Luna's "otherworldy features" (her long limbs, "oval-shaped face and almond eyes") not being traditionally readily associated with Black women, as they alienated other African-Americans, and provided white advertisers with a manufactured sense of racial superiority and which may be considered as tokenism on the behalf of the advertising agencies involved. Jane Hoffman described the evolution of the acceptable negro from white-passing models (first used in 1950s advertisements in magazines like Jet) to the 1960s replacement, the exotic negro, who was 'the Negro girl you'd think of as something else. She wasn't even beautiful-just a weird creature, some kind of space thing, She had to be so bizarre that no [Black person] could identify with [them]'. This typecasting of Black models limited Hoffman's own chances because she was "not Negro enough" to be Black under the respectability politics of white industry standards for Black models at that time. White American society preferred 'exotic' Luna over women like Hoffman as they provided an existing false narrative which fuelled their preexisting media biases about Blackness and its otherness, reinforced existing stereotypes, excluded Black women, and narrowed the definition of what Black beauty could take the appearance of how an acceptable negro would appear, in opposition to whites who would be seen as the default of acceptability and whose appearance would not be called into question so easily.

Indeed, they infantilized 'Black women [who] could be sexy, sinuous, glamorous ... marvellous entertainers ... [b]ut when it came it fashion ... magazines and advertising, ... [they] simply not exist. They were not considered to have the necessary spending power that publishers and agencies wanted to exploit.' All fashionable images of Black women were made through the primitivist lens which Baker herself used so successfully to create a new beauty standard in 1920s France. Until when in 1965 Luna broke the color barrier as a model and created new media content which showed an African American woman for the first time in high fashion magazines within visible beauty standards, prior to this an African-American woman wearing scant clothing was 'the stuff of the white man's sexual fantasies ... [and until Luna the] kind of image a black girl could strive for; ... [that or to] fall back on imitating whatever the current white style of beauty happened to be. For years, [Black] girls [had] literally been through torture in their efforts to achieve a white hairstyle ... [using] dangerous hot combs ... or chemical solutions like sodium hydroxide or lye which could burn the hair away ... [or] white style wigs that Black women wore in order to look acceptable'. The same thing applied to cosmetics. ... The Supremes [then being] a perfect example of how Black girls built their glamour around white ideals of beauty ... and so theirs was the look longed for by blacks from Brixton to Harlem: there was simply no one else you could try to imitate. Prevailing beauty standards made African-American women into Black bodies subject to derision based on the prevailing negative beauty standards of the day, a tightrope of racialized worldviews of white fashion photographers and beauty which Luna had to walk to create this new content.

In the factor of race, she further stated: "Most of my publicity has been because I'm dark-skinned. But I think the reaction would have been the same if I were white because of my [body] features" referring to her uncommon height and bodily proportions which these companies regarded as exotic. Although claims are often made that comments like this is a sign that Luna was attempting to shift away from her African-American heritage,  she would go on to carry out a public anti-racial-discrimination campaign alongside David Anthony (of The Touchables fame) with clothing designed by Mary Quant, being shot by David Bailey. When she was denied service in 1968 in a Mayfair hotel, she also filed a complaint for racial discrimination with the board of racial discrimination. The American print journalist Judy Stone wrote a now-infamous profile of Luna for The New York Times in 1968, describing Luna using racialist language such as "secretive, mysterious, contradictory, evasive, mercurial, and insistent upon her multiracial lineage—exotic, chameleon strands of Indigenous-Mexican, Indonesian, Irish, and, last but least escapable, African". Luna responded that "the civil-rights movement has my greatest support, but I don't want to get involved racially". Dazed reporter Phillipa Burton notes how it today "makes for uncomfortable reading; the interviewer's obsessive probing of her multiracial lineage jarring with Luna's obvious displeasure at talking about it." When Stone asked her about whether her appearances in Hollywood films would benefit the cause of Black actresses, Luna replied, "If it brings about more jobs for Mexicans, Asians, Native Americans, Africans, groovy. It could be good, it could be bad. I couldn't care less" which are indicative of the limited and poor quality of jobs and opportunities available to Luna at the time in an environment which seemingly only accepted models who passed the brown paper bag test.

Comments such as those have meant that she has been widely forgotten in favour of Beverly Johnson, whilst revealing the complex dynamics that she refused to be defined by in being typecast in the roles such as Diana Ross in the film Mahogany; a media portrayal that may have been a cause for conflict in her identity as a Black woman and someone in the public eye; such as when the protagonist of Mahogany is referred to as an inanimate object and the misogyny of the modeling industry in the film which as a "Black body" altered how Luna was to be both remembered and perceived in the short and long term, placing more value on her as a body (valuing looks and the profit involved from her modelling) than Freeman as a person, thus disregarding her full worth and objectifying Luna. After her death, Luna's widower Italian photographer Luigi Cazzaniga said that Luna self-identified as a "mulatta" and that she "felt rejected by the Black community and the white one". Her daughter notes "people longed for her to become a symbol of the African-American resistance; a role she struggled with as someone who identified as mixed race." Penultimately with regards to the racism she faced in the US, Luna believed that questions surrounding her Blackness and how she fit into American society being "a quarter Black" were "America's problem", often attempting to escape labels major publications placed on her, replying to the Times: "Yeah, I'm an American on Black and white, but I'm me, I'm me" in an attempt to reject American notions of race and to establish herself a more fully rounded human being.

By 1974 having not found full acceptance in Europe either, she was "caught between the insinuating effects of racial/cultural renunciation [and] sexual stereotype ... Luna's response was to wear the mask [of one of Giacometti's skeletal sculptures] and ... to become a negligible component of life, hovering between existence and nothingness" in Italy in the public eye. From this time on, she had problems figuring out who she was as a Black woman eventually becoming a "soul on ice": an entity encased and obscured by its own false image, which only hinted at the naked power and creative potential that lay beneath the surface", or a shell of the former aspirations she held in her identity in youth. From a heady time when "Luna had skipped modelings apprenticeship stage of endlless castings and rejections from racist fashion magazines, and come straight in at the top ... [having] made the cover of a top fashion magazine, worn the world's most expensive dresses, and commanded a day rate of up to $100-an-hour - all by the age of 19".

Romantic relationships
In the mid-1960s, Luna was married to an anonymous German actor for ten months. Later she reportedly was engaged to the Austrian-born Swiss actor Maximilian Schell, then to an unnamed Danish photographer and Georg Willing, a German actor who appeared in European horror films (such as 1970's Necropolis) and with the Living Theatre. She would frequently stop "short of making any lasting commitment to her suitors" though may have had this history as her history with men was checked, model Geraldine Smith recalled that in 1967, "Donyale had this crazy boyfriend who came in last night and smashed her over the head with a beer bottle" for instance.

In 1968, Luna was purportedly dating the Australian pop artist Martin Sharp.
Around 1969 Luna was also romantically involved with German actor Klaus Kinski, however, the relationship ended when Kinski asked her entourage to leave his house in Rome concerned that their drug use could damage his career.

She would later move to Italy and continue her acting career there. By September 1969 she had met her next partner, Luigi Cazzaniga at a fashion show in Rome. However she was then rumoured by the Italian press to be dating the Dominican actor Juan Fernandez whom she met around 1969, and is thought to have been dating in 1972 when filming Salome. Luna later married Italian photographer Luigi Cazzaniga after having met him at a party in Italy. For the first two months of their relationship they could not speak to each other as Cazzaniga only knew how to speak Italian, he noted he "liked ... her [for] her love of creativity and for everything that wasn't square." They eventually married in California in 1976 and in 1977 they had a daughter, Dream Cazzaniga.  Dream's name was inspired by Martin Luther King Jr.'s famous "I Have a Dream" speech. The couple eventually separated and, while still legally married, were estranged at the time of Luna's death of heroin overdose.

Legacy
Since her death, Donyale Luna's 1966 Vogue cover has been hailed as opening doors for Black models and normalising the inclusion of African-American and African-Europeans on magazines previously catering to majority white demographics. Pat Cleveland noted Luna as her own inspiration who (along with Naomi Sims) opened doors for other women of color in the 1960s. Thus leading to more appearances for women, such as Sims 1967 New York Times fashion supplement cover and Beverly Johnsons American Vogue 1974 cover for example. This continued with British Vogue using Black models Gail O'Neill in March 1986, Naomi Campbell 5 times between December 1987 - August 2002, and Jourdan Dunn in November 2015 as solo cover models under Anna Wintour, Elizabeth Tilberis and Alexandra Shulman's tenures.

Luna's reputation as one who often rejected type-cast labelling, has led to the promulgation of erasure of her achievements in the fashion industry. Phillipa Burton wrote in 2009, how "clean-cut models like Beverly Johnson and Iman, whose lives were not to end murkily through an overzealous use of heroin, were louder and prouder ambassadors of the "Black is beautiful" message. Their more palatable versions of Black womanhood loom large in the public consciousness today. Eccentric Luna, on the other hand, who was eternally cagey about her racial identity, waxed lyrical about LSD in interviews and had an endearing habit of not wearing shoes, has, for the most part, been forgotten ... depressingly, the biggest triumph of Luna's career – her groundbreaking Vogue cover of 1966 – represents a war that is very much still being waged. Sarah Doukas, founder of Storm model agency ... grimly admits that a Black model gracing the cover of a mainstream publication is 'still unusual'" and it has been noted she may have been part of the tokenism of advertising agencies to lure in Black consumers." This being consistent with the fact that over time, the loss of African-American history has prompted the creation of first lists. Her career has thus been described as a "meteoric ascent to fame and freefall into anonymity [which] frequently morphs into bodily speculation and social isolation".

However the designer Stephen Burrows also noted "[Luna] was ahead of the Black model thing. There weren't too many around [in the US in the 1960s]" when commenting on Lunas' extravagant outlook and attitude towards her own career opportunities. Due in part to the timing of the "Black is beautiful" movement only gaining traction towards the end of Luna's career as "Black models didn't truly enjoy their coming out until the seventies" and her New Age beliefs, models such as Beverly Johnson now feature more prominently on Black-firsts lists, even though Luna's cover in 1966 predates Johnson's by eight years. Luna is usually today therefore regarded as "a key player in the mid- to late 1960s fashion, film, and experimental theater scenes" who by the 1970s was "unable to move beyond the external and self-imposed limitations for someone of her idiosyncratic temperamental and tenuous lifestyle ... [which] united to diminish and obscure her once impressive figure, which then led to her public erasure".". Thus Luna leaves behind a mixed legacy as a model who both broke the colour barrier and as an underground actress, best remembered for her 1966 Vogue cover.

In her role as the first Black model the cover of a major print magazine, Luna has had "renewed interest" in her modeling career on social media, fashion bloggers, and among Black business owners. With the promotion of editors at British Vogue such as Edward Enninful in 2017, British Vogue covers starring Black models have also increased.  She has also appeared in the 2008 all-Black Vogue issue and was recognized by Naomi Campbell in her CFDA acceptance speech in 2019, and Nan Goldin dedicated the Exhibit Sirens for her. She was also the inspiration for Pat McGrath for her sixth edition of her Mothership makeup palette. The Afro-Brazilian TV personality Thelma Assis has also recreated the Twen photoshoot on the July 2020 cover of Harper's Bazaar Brazil. In November 2020, actress Zendaya appeared in a photoshoot inspired by Luna for the 50th anniversary of Essence.

Filmography

References

External links 
 
 Donyale Luna at aenigma
 
 Patty Pravo Michelle featuring Donyale Luna 
 Donyale Luna for Mati Klarwein
 Donyale Luna in Sydney, News Broadcast

1945 births
1979 deaths
20th-century American actresses
Accidental deaths in Italy
Actresses from Detroit
African-American female models
African-American models
American film actresses
African-American actresses
American female models
Articles containing video clips
Cass Technical High School alumni
Deaths by heroin overdose
Drug-related deaths in Italy
20th-century African-American women
20th-century African-American people